Narcisse Ambanza (born 3 December 1996) is a Congolese-Canadian professional basketball player. He plays for the DR Congo men's national basketball team since making his debut in 2022.

Born in Toronto to Congolese parents, he played four seasons of U Sports college basketball for the Winnipeg Wesmen and led the team in scoring in 2018 and 2019. In 2019, Ambanza joined the professional team Edmonton Stingers of the Canadian Elite Basketball League (CEBL).

After sitting out the 2020–21 season that was cancelled due to the COVID-19 pandemic, in 2022, Ambanza joined the Congolese club Espoir Fukash of the Basketball Africa League (BAL).

Personal 
Amanda graduated with a degree in Business Administration at the University of Winnipeg.

References 

BC Espoir Fukash players
1996 births
Basketball players from Toronto
Canadian men's basketball players
Democratic Republic of the Congo men's basketball players
Guards (basketball)
Edmonton Stingers players
Living people